Kharsundi is a village located in Atpadi Taluka, Sangli District of Maharashtra, India.

Kharsundi is well known for Lord Siddhanath. Siddhanath is believed to be an incarnation of Lord Shiva and it is believed that he is the protector of  Kharaspundi. Siddhanath is the patron god of Atpadi and adjacent regions and one of among several regional protective (Kshetrapal) gods of Maharashtra. The village is well known in southern India for its large cattle fair, mainly for Khillari breed bulls.

Places Nearby
 Walvan - 06 km
 Bhood - 13.5 km
 Lengre - 17.7 km
 Vita - 31.7 km
 Balwadi - 05 km
 Balewadi - 06 km
 Atpadi - 23.4 km
 Kargani - 13.2 km
 Ghulewadi - 03 km
 Nelkarji - 07 km
 Bhivghat - 13 km
 Kankatrewadi - 6.3 km
 Kavathe Mahankal - 47.5 km

References

Villages in Sangli district